Patrick Villars (born 21 May 1984) is a Ghanaian football player.

Career 
Villars has played for the Ebusua Dwarfs, for Turkish club Trabzonspor, in South Korea for Bucheon SK, for Israeli club Maccabi Petah Tikva FC, in Belgium for Beringen-Heusden-Zolder, for Chinese club Qingdao Hailifeng, and in Northern Cyprus for Küçük Kaymaklı Türk S.K.

International 
He was part of the Ghanaian 2004 Olympic football team, who exited in the first round, having finished in third place in group B and was member of the Black Satellites team at 2001 FIFA World Youth Championship in Argentina.

Honors and awards
FIFA World Youth Championship runner-up: 2001
National cup- 40
African Youth Championship]runner-up:2001

References

External links
 

1984 births
Living people
Association football defenders
Ghanaian footballers
Ghanaian expatriate footballers
Ghana international footballers
Ghana under-20 international footballers
Trabzonspor footballers
Jeju United FC players
Maccabi Petah Tikva F.C. players
Süper Lig players
Israeli Premier League players
K League 1 players
Expatriate footballers in Turkey
Expatriate footballers in South Korea
Expatriate footballers in Israel
Expatriate footballers in Belgium
Footballers at the 2004 Summer Olympics
Olympic footballers of Ghana
Ghanaian expatriate sportspeople in South Korea
Ghanaian expatriate sportspeople in Turkey
Ebusua Dwarfs players
Ghanaian expatriate sportspeople in Israel
Expatriate footballers in Northern Cyprus